The Spanish Regions Championship  (Spanish:Campeonato de Selecciones Territoriales) is a rugby union competition in Spain featuring the representative teams of the autonomous communities. The competition is organised by the Spanish Rugby Federation. The Basque Country were the inaugural winners in 1983–84. They are also the competitions most successful team. The competition is usually played as a knockout tournament. However it has occasionally adopted a league system.

Finals

Notes
 No final. League system used.
 Basque Country won Group A. Castile-León won Group B
 Basque Country won Group A. Andalusia won Group B

List of winners by team

References

Rugby union competitions in Spain
Rugby union competitions in Europe for clubs and provinces
1983 establishments in Spain